Sirjapali is a village of the Kesinga in Kalahandi district of Indian state Odisha. The Tel river flows just 2 km from the village.

Villages in Kalahandi district